The Eyes as the Accuser (German: Die Augen als Ankläger) is a 1920 German crime film directed by Fritz Bernhardt and starring Evi Eva, Heinrich Schroth and Bernhard Goetzke.

The film's sets were designed by the art director Siegfried Wroblewsky.

Cast
 Evi Eva as Detektivin Evi Gardener 
 Heinrich Schroth as Detektiv Bill Roid 
 Bernhard Goetzke
 Ludwig Rex
 Paul Donner as Polizeikommissar 
 Preben J. Rist as Professor für Chemie Rott 
 Ernst Rückert as Fabrikant Paul Ramond 
 Eddie Seefeld
 Maat St. Clair

References

Bibliography
 Grange, William. Cultural Chronicle of the Weimar Republic. Scarecrow Press, 2008.

External links

1920 films
Films of the Weimar Republic
Films directed by Fritz Bernhardt
German silent feature films
1920 crime films
German crime films
German black-and-white films
1920s German films